Igor Kojić (born 30 July 1987) is a Bosnian Serb former footballer who played as a goalkeeper.

Career
In November 2008, while playing for Hajduk Beograd, Kojić gained national attention for his performance in a Serbian Cup game versus Vojvodina. He initially saved one penalty during the regular 90 minutes, before saving three more penalties in the shoot-out and converting the winning one himself to push the club into the quarter-finals of the competition.

In February 2011, Kojić joined Cypriot club Doxa Katokopias, appearing in one league game in the remainder of the season.

In July 2011, Kojić signed a one-year contract with Portuguese club Santa Clara.

Personal life
Kojić is the son of Serbian singer Dragan Kojić Keba. He was married to Croatian singer Severina from 2015 to 2021.

References

External links
 

1987 births
Living people
Sportspeople from Mostar
Serbs of Bosnia and Herzegovina
Serbia and Montenegro footballers
Serbian footballers
Association football goalkeepers
FK Obilić players
FK Bežanija players
FK Rad players
FK Hajduk Beograd players
FC Dinamo București players
FK Smederevo players
Doxa Katokopias FC players
C.D. Santa Clara players
First League of Serbia and Montenegro players
Serbian First League players
Cypriot First Division players
Serbian expatriate footballers
Expatriate footballers in Romania
Expatriate footballers in Cyprus
Expatriate footballers in Portugal
Serbian expatriate sportspeople in Romania
Serbian expatriate sportspeople in Cyprus
Serbian expatriate sportspeople in Portugal